Neligh Township, Nebraska may refer to the following places:

Neligh Township, Antelope County, Nebraska
Neligh Township, Cuming County, Nebraska